The Lahore Qalandars is a franchise cricket team that represents Lahore in the Pakistan Super League. They are one of the five teams that had a competition in the 2017 Pakistan Super League. The team was captained by Brendon McCullum, and they won three matches from their eight matches in the PSL 2017. They stand on fifth position and as a result they were eliminated in group stage.

Squad
Lahore Qalandars icon player in the first season of the PSL Chris Gayle was traded for Sohail Tanvir of the Karachi Kings during the off-season trade window. Sohaib Maqsood was also traded for Aamer Yamin of Peshawar Zalmi.
In September 2016, the team signed New Zealand's former captain Brendon McCullum as their new captain.

During the 2017 PSL players draft, Lahore picked a number of new players, including bowlers Yasir Shah and Sunil Narine. Later  Dwayne Bravo and Anton Devcich were replaced with Jason Roy and James Franklin while Shaun Tait was replaced with Chris Green.

Pakistan Super League
In their opening game of the 2017 season, Lahore Qalandars lost a closely fought match to the Quetta Gladiators. In pursuit of 137, they managed 128 before being bowled out in the penultimate over. The team bounced back in the next match by beating defending champions, Islamabad United. A partnership of 71 runs between Jason Roy and Umar Akmal set up the Qalandar's chase of 159 before a quick cameo of 26(12) by Sunil Narine finished the game. However, in the following game, against Peshawar Zalmi, the Qalandars collapsed to 59 all-out inside 11 overs – the second shortest innings in T20 cricket history. But, Yasir Shah took 4 wickets for 7 runs in the defense to almost take his team to victory before the Zalmis prevailed by 3-wickets.

As the tournament progressed to Sharjah, the Qalandars registered their second win on the trot. That too against arch-rivals, Karachi Kings. The match was hard-fought between the two sides before the Qalandars prevailed by 7 runs in the final over. Fakhar Zaman, who was also adjudged man-of-the-match, set up his team's target of 180 through his quick-fire innings of 56(36). But in the next game, against Quetta Gladiators, the Qalandars were unable to defend a target of 201 despite being in control for most of the match. They allowed 78 runs to be leaked from the last 3.5 overs to end up on the losing side. However, following this loss, the Qalandars won against Islamabad United by 1-wicket in a tense contest that saw them chase 146 runs in 19.3 overs. Umar Akmal anchored his team's innings by scoring 66 off 42 balls before Grant Elliott finished the chase with a six over midwicket.

As the tournament shifted back to Dubai, the Qalandars suffered back to back defeats against Peshawar Zalmi and arch-rivals, Karachi Kings. Against the Zalmis, the team couldn't chase down 167 after a drastic collapse from 38–1 to 43–6 and fell short by 17 runs. Following this, the Qalandars lost a must-win game against the Kings by 5-wickets. After putting up a respectable target of 156 on board, the team leaked 14-runs from the final over – including sixes on the last two balls to end up on the losing side. These two loses meant that the Qalandars finished at the bottom of the table after the league stage and were, in return, knocked out from the play-off proceedings for the second consecutive year.

Season standings
Lahore Qalandars finished fifth in the points table of 2017 Pakistan Super League.

References

2017 in Punjab, Pakistan
2017 Pakistan Super League
Qalandars in 2017
2017